William Farrish (August 9, 1835 – June 12, 1920) was an American politician in the state of Washington. He served in the Washington House of Representatives from 1889 to 1895.

References

Republican Party members of the Washington House of Representatives
1835 births
1920 deaths